The Jesus Music is a 2021 American documentary film distributed by Lionsgate and directed by the Erwin brothers, detailing the history of contemporary Christian music as a musical and cultural phenomenon.

The film was released by Lionsgate on October 1, 2021. The Jesus Music was nominated for the GMA Dove Award for Inspirational Film/Series of the Year at the 2022 GMA Dove Awards.

Synopsis
The film documents the history of contemporary Christian music, from its roots in the Jesus music of the 1970s, through the Christian rock and Christian metal eras of the 1980s and 1990s, into the rise of praise and worship music in the early 21st century. A number of prominent figures in Christian music are interviewed, including Amy Grant, Michael W. Smith, Steven Curtis Chapman, CeCe Winans, Toby McKeehan, Michael Tait, Kirk Franklin, Russ Taff, Lecrae, and Lauren Daigle.

Promotion
An accompanying book, written by Marshall Terrill, was published alongside the release of the film. The film was screened for an audience of music industry personnel, including many of the artists interviewed in the film, in Nashville the week prior to its theatrical release.

Reception
Steve Pulaski of Influx Magazine and his personal website gave the film an "A−" letter-grade, calling it "the Summer of Soul for Christian music," in reference to the Academy Award-winning documentary about the 1969 Harlem Cultural Festival released earlier in the year, and added that it "is such a formidable documentary because it consistently reminds us that music is the most universally powerful tool we have as humans. Thoughts you can convey through song often hit harder than they do in casual conversation. Whether you're a fan of contemporary Christian music, a devout believer, or simply someone hungry for knowledge, this is a documentary well-worth your time."

Audiences polled by CinemaScore gave the film an average grade of "A" on an A+ to F scale.

References

External links

Official trailer

2021 films
American documentary films
Lionsgate films
Documentary films about music and musicians
2021 documentary films
2020s English-language films
Films directed by the Erwin Brothers
2020s American films